Ludhiana is Punjab, India city's and largest industrial hub. It is the biggest city north of Delhi. It is known for hosiery and bicycle manufacturing.

As of 2014, Ludhiana had 19.1 percent of Punjab's employment.

Textile industry
Before Partition, Lahore was the biggest industrial hub of Punjab. Then Industry moved and settled in Ludhiana. Ludhiana became across India for its hosiery and textile industry. Now Ludhiana is Punjab's and North India's largest city (after Delhi).

Vardhman Group is a textile group based there. Vardhman was established in 1965 by Lala Rattan Chand Oswal. The group is engaged in manufacturing and trading in yarn, fabric, sewing thread, acrylic fibre and alloy steel.

Duke Duke Fashions India Limited, Ludhiana-based Duke Fashions (India) Ltd., a much-favoured name in clothing, footwear and accessories, Duke is acknowledged today as the undisputed leader in the industry. The company's values are based on its authentic fashion understanding heritage, dating back to the launch of the brand in 1966. Since then the brand has been further developed, taking influence from the latest international fashion trends, and is now truly a pure Indian Clothing and Footwear Brand with a PAN India presence. Duke Fashions (India) Limited Pioneered the T-shirt culture in India in 1966, and gradually established several new trends in knitting garments and fabric research.

DUKE offers a full range of products which includes, T-Shirts, Jackets, Sweaters, Sweatshirts, Tracksuits, Thermals, Jogging suits, Shirts, Denim and Trousers, Lowers, Bermudas, Shorts, Value packs, Lounge wears, Sportswear, Fast dry, Activewear, Jeggings, Hot pants, Shorts, Shoes, and Accessories etc. for Men, Women and Kids.

Ludhiana Stock Exchange
LSC was established in the year 1983. By 1999, the exchange had a total of 284 brokers, out of which 79 were corporate brokers. Among 284 brokers, it was further classified as 212 proprietor broker, 2 partnership broker and 70 corporate broker. Then, there was only 2 sub- brokers registered. It has branches in Jalandhar, Amritsar and Chandigarh.

References